Sir Edwin Andrew Cornwall, 1st Baronet, PC, DL (30 June 1863 – 27 February 1953) was an English politician and coal merchant.

Cornwall was born in Lapford, Devon. At the age of thirteen he became a clerk in a coal merchant's in Hammersmith, London, and by seventeen was manager of the company's depot at Kensington. A few years later he set up his own business. In 1900 he became the first mayor of the new Metropolitan Borough of Fulham, having long served on the predecessor vestry. In 1892 he was elected to the London County Council, sitting for the Progressive Party, for which he was for eight years chief whip. In 1904 he was elected chairman of the LCC and as chairman of the Parliamentary Committee of the council led efforts to clear the slums between Holborn and the Strand on the site of which were built Aldwych and Kingsway.

Having unsuccessfully contested the Fulham constituency in 1895 and 1900, in 1906 Cornwall was elected to Parliament as a Liberal for Bethnal Green North East. He was appointed a deputy lieutenant of the County of London at the end of March 1906. From December 1916 to February 1919 he served as Minister of National Health Insurance and Comptroller of the Household and from 1918 to 1922 he was Deputy Chairman of Ways and Means and Deputy Speaker of the House of Commons. He was also vice-chairman of the County of London Territorial Force Association from 1908 to 1914 and a member of the Port of London Authority.

Cornwall was knighted in 1905, created a baronet in 1918, and appointed to the Privy Council in the 1921 Birthday Honours, entitling him to the style "The Right Honourable".

Footnotes

External links 
 

1863 births
1953 deaths
People from Mid Devon District
English businesspeople
Mayors of places in Greater London
Councillors in Greater London
Deputy Lieutenants of the County of London
Members of London County Council
Liberal Party (UK) MPs for English constituencies
UK MPs 1906–1910
UK MPs 1910
UK MPs 1910–1918
UK MPs 1918–1922
Baronets in the Baronetage of the United Kingdom
Knights Bachelor
Members of the Privy Council of the United Kingdom
Progressive Party (London) politicians